Eduardo Chacon Coelho Lacerda simply known as Du is a Brazilian footballer who played for Southern Samity in the I-League as a defender.

External links
 IndianFootball.Com Interview
 Times of India Article
 goal.com
 

Brazilian footballers
1978 births
Living people
Expatriate footballers in India
Brazilian expatriate sportspeople in India
I-League players
Association football defenders